Milk VFX is an independent visual effects studio in London, England and Cardiff, Wales. The company was launched in 2013.  Milk VFX is known for creating complex and innovative sequences for high-end television and feature films such as Doctor Who (notably the 50th anniversary episode), it's spin off Class, Good Omens, Sherlock, Fantastic Beasts and Where to Find Them, Ex Machina and Possessor.

In 2017, Milk raised $2.5 million to fund expansion and announced that Ivan Dunleavy, former CEO of Pinewood Studios, had joined as Chairman of the Board as the studio expands its focus on feature film work.

References

Visual effects companies
Film production companies of the United Kingdom